The Crusaders is a group of fictional characters appearing in American comic books published by Marvel Comics. The characters first appear in The Invaders #14 (March 1977) and were created by Roy Thomas, Jack Kirby, and Frank Robbins.

Publication history
The Crusaders first appear in the World War II title The Invaders and capture the crew of a crashed German bomber. Accepted by the British people, the team (Captain Wings, Dyna-Mite, Ghost Girl, the Spirit of '76, Thunder Fist, and Tommy Lightning) becomes the official protectors of the current king (George VI), thereby displacing the American superhero team the Invaders. The Crusaders are revealed to be guided by a cab driver and apparent British spy called "Alfie", who can cancel their powers courtesy of a technological belt the character wears.

Dyna-Mite, who has no memory of his former life, becomes suspicious and spies on Alfie, learning that he is a Nazi agent and is planning to use the heroes to assassinate the king. Dyna-Mite warns the Invaders, and Alfie instigates a fight between the heroes and the Crusaders. The Nazi is killed in a car crash attempting to escape from the android Human Torch. The Crusaders, now powerless, disband, although Dyna-Mite—revealed to be Roger Aubrey, the close friend of Brian Falsworth, the brother of Invader Spitfire—remains trapped in a minute form.

Aubrey is eventually restored to normal height and adopts Falsworth's former heroic identity as the Destroyer, now calling himself the Mighty Destroyer (as Falsworth eventually succeeded his father, James Montgomery Falsworth, as Union Jack II).

Conception
The Crusaders were based on the DC Comics superhero team the Freedom Fighters. The character associations are: Captain Wings and the Black Condor; Dyna-Mite and Doll Man; Ghost Girl and the Phantom Lady; the Spirit of '76 and Uncle Sam; Thunder Fist and the Human Bomb; and Tommy Lightning and the Ray.

At the same time that the Invaders were meeting the Crusaders in Marvel Comics, DC Comics' Freedom Fighters were also facing off against a team called the Crusaders, with the DC version of the Crusaders based upon Marvel Comics' Invaders (several of the Crusaders that fought the Freedom Fighters were really "comic book fans" named "Lennie" (Len Wein), "Marvin" (Marv Wolfman), "Arch" (Archie Goodwin), and "Roy" (Roy Thomas), as shown in Freedom Fighters #9).

References

External links
 

Characters created by Frank Robbins
Characters created by Jack Kirby
Characters created by Roy Thomas
Crusaders
Marvel Comics superheroes
United States-themed superheroes